John D'earth (born March 30, 1950) is an American post-bop/hard bop jazz trumpeter born in Framingham, Massachusetts who has appeared on recordings by Dave Matthews and Bruce Hornsby as well as recording a number of CDs on his own. He currently resides in Charlottesville, Virginia.

Early
John Edward Dearth II was born in 1950 in Framingham, Massachusetts, growing up in nearby Holliston. His father had survived the Pacific theater of World War II and was "obsessed" with jazz. D'earth, who added the apostrophe to his name later in life, says of his progenitor, "He was a maniac for music and for jazz music. He was my first teacher. He revealed to me mysteries of art and music that are priceless."

His father would blast his records throughout the night, driving the family crazy. He would also sit with his two-year-old son, teaching him to play drum brushes on a metal tray. His father was "drawn to the complexities of be-bop" with its raw rhythms and stylings. "He hated white bands that were corny and tight," D'earth states. "Those were prejudices too, and I learned some of those prejudices early on."

The D'earth family lived in a house from the 1690s that had been The Littlefield Tavern during the Colonial era. D'earth's parents divorced when he was eight, around the time he got his first trumpet. He immediately walked out into the yard and played it to the trees, discovering scales on his own.

Louis Armstrong and His Hot Five were D'earth's favorite band, but he also appreciated classical music. Jazz instruction wasn't so easy to find in the early 1960s, but D'earth crossed paths with Henry "Boots" Mussulli, who was a veteran of the big band days.

This Sicilian alto saxophone player and arranger had opened the Sons of Italy Crystal Room, a speakeasy that presented acts like Count Basie and Roy Eldridge in nearby Milford. He was part of a group of jazz instructors who helped form Berklee College of Music.

One day Mussulli sat a young D'earth next to him and called a friend and simply said, "Listen." He and D'earth began improvising on the Charlie Parker be-pop classic "Confirmation". When done, Mussulli picked the receiver and said, "Fourteen" — then hung up. That experience changed D'earth's life, confirming his musical gift. As a teenager, DownBeat said of his performance at the Newport Jazz Festival that he played "like a young Freddie Hubbard."

On Mussulli's impact D'earth says:

D'earth met Robert Jospé, a jazz drummer who would later relocate to Charlottesville and become a UVA music instructor, in 1967 at The Cambridge School of Weston, a preparatory high school near Boston. They started a group named Fire and Ice, and "began a collaboration that continues today."

Career 
D'earth attended Harvard University briefly only to drop out and pursue his musical career. In his early years he played in Bob Moses' innovative bands. He co-founded the group Cosmology (Vanguard Records) with bandmates drummer Robert Jospe and singer Dawn Thompson — whom D'earth later married. Jospé, D'earth, and Thompson, whom he met in New York, came to Charlottesville in 1981 for a summer and decided to settle there. Before heading for New York City, Thompson had helped found the famed Prism Coffeehouse musical venue in Charlottesville.

D'earth serves as Director of Jazz Performance at the University of Virginia and was at one point the jazz artist in residence at Virginia Commonwealth University. D'earth was music teacher at The Tandem School in Charlottesville from the early to mid-1980s. 

D'earth regularly plays at Miller's Downtown on the Charlottesville pedestrian mall with other musicians including JC Kuhl, Pete Spaar, Jamal Millner, Devonne Harris, Pureum Jin, Brian Caputo, Wells Hanley, Adam Larrabee, Brian Jones, and many others. He often played at Fellini's No. 9 with Devonne Harris (drums), Bob Hallahan (piano), and Pete Spaar (upright bass).

D'earth makes frequent appearances with younger up-and-coming players as well as older mainstay musicians alike in the Richmond, Virginia area. D'earth is known for his work with musicians such as Miles Davis, Buddy Rich, Dave Matthews Band, and Emily Remler. He has recorded for Vanguard Records, ENJA Records, DoubleTime Jazz, and his own Cosmology label.

Discography
Solo

On (Cosmology, 2013)
 Yo, Susannah
 What Woody Do (Adam's Vamp)
 Prelude II
 Outside Insight
 Market
 Goodbye Secret King (for LeRoi Moore)
 Lady on a Train
 We Shall See
 Water Is The Blood of Earth

John D'earth - trumpet, flugelhorn
Pete Spaar - bass
Wells Hanley - piano
Devonne Harris - drums
J.C. Kuhl - tenor saxophone

Restoration Comedy (Double-Time, 2000)
John D'earth - trumpet, composer, producer
Howard Curtis - drums
Mike Richmond - upright bass
Mulgrew Miller - piano
Jerry Bergonzi - sax

Thursday Night Live at Millers (Cosmology, 1998)
John D'earth - trumpet
Dawn Thompson - vocals
Jeff Decker and Bobby Read - saxophones
Jamal Millner - guitar
Wells Hanley - piano
Pete Spaar - upright bass
Robert Jospé - drums
guest Doug Bethel - trombone
produced by Greg Howard

One Bright Glance (Enja, 1990)
John D'earth - trumpet, composer
John Abercrombie - guitar, guitar synthesizer
Marc Johnson - bass
Howard Curtis - drums
Steve Gaboury - producer, engineer

With Thompson D'earth

When the Serpent Flies (Cosmology, 2006)
Dawn Thompson - vocals
John D'earth - trumpet and flugelhorn
J.C. Kuhl - tenor saxophone
Jamal Millner - guitar
Daniel Clarke - piano
Pete Spaar - double bass
Brian Caputo - drums
produced by Greg Howard

Mercury (Cosmology, 2001)
Dawn Thompson - vocals
John D'Earth - trumpet
Carter Beauford - drums
Dave Matthews - vocals
Jamal Millner - guitar
Bobby Read - sax
Wells Hanley - piano
Pete Spaar - upright bass
produced by Greg Howard

As sideman
With Ray Anderson
Big Band Record (Gramavision, 1994) with the George Gruntz Concert Jazz Band
With Emily Remler
Transitions (Concord Records, 1983)
Catwalk (Concord, 1985)

Honors, awards, distinctions 
 D'earth appears in The Biographical Encyclopedia of Jazz, by Leonard Feather and Ira Gitler
(Oxford University Press, 1999); pages 175–76.

Personal 
D'earth appeared regularly with his vocalist wife Dawn Thompson, who died August 31, 2017 after surviving nine years with brain cancer. She was born in Alexandria, Virginia on October 9, 1946.

References

External links
 
 John D'earth at the University of Virginia
 John D'earth biography, discography and album reviews, credits & releases at AllMusic
 Web Archive of Thompson D'earth Band official webpage.

1950 births
American jazz trumpeters
American male trumpeters
Post-bop trumpeters
Hard bop trumpeters
Living people
Musicians from Charlottesville, Virginia
Jazz musicians from Virginia
People from Holliston, Massachusetts
21st-century trumpeters
Jazz musicians from Massachusetts
21st-century American male musicians
American male jazz musicians
Vanguard Records artists
Double-Time Records artists